Sayyid Mostafa Tajzadeh is an Iranian reformist politician and a senior member of Islamic Iran Participation Front, as well as Mojahedin of the Islamic Revolution of Iran Organization.

He was imprisoned at Evin Prison from 2009 until 2016.

Tajzadeh was briefly Acting Minister of Interior under administration of President Mohammad Khatami after impeachment of Abdollah Nouri, advisor to President Mohammad Khatami in his last two years of administration, a deputy at Ministry of Interior and Ministry of Culture.

He is also a member of Association of Iranian Journalists.

Political career
In 1975, Tajzadeh went to the United States to study and became a member of Muslim Students Association, active against Shah of Iran. With the start of the Iranian Revolution in 1978, he left university and returned to Iran.

Tajzadeh served as the Political deput of the Ministry of Interior of Iran in the government of Mohammad Khatami, and under the Minister Abdollah Noori, since 1997, after being introduced to Noori by Gholamhossein Karbaschi and Mohammad Atrianfar. The first Iranian elections for the City and Village Councils of Iran happened under Tajzadeh. Later, he became an Adviser to the President of Iran, Mohammad Khatami, from November 21, 2004 until the presidency of Mahmoud Ahmadinejad.

He started working in the Islamic Republic government as an employee of the Ministry of Culture and Islamic Guidance in May 1982. He went up to become a vice minister when Mohammad Khatami was the Minister of Culture and Islamic Guidance. He left the ministry after a while, and worked for the newspaper Hamshahri until 1997.

Tajzadeh was one of seven leading reformists who filed a lawsuit against several commanders of the Islamic Revolutionary Guard Corps (IRGC) for their alleged intervention in Iran's presidential elections.

Government work ban 
In March 2001, while he was Political deputy at Ministry of Interior faced with charges of election fraud at 2000 Iranian legislative election after a clash with Guardian Council. He was barred from all government employment for three years, but did not appeal the verdict.

Imprisonment 
Amnesty International reported that he was arrested in June 2009, amidst the 2009 Iranian election protests. He was convicted of "assembly and collusion against national security" and "propaganda against the regime", sentenced to 6 years in prison and a 10-year ban on political and press activities by Branch 15 of the Tehran Islamic Revolutionary Court. He was imprisoned in Evin Prison from 2009 until 2016. In 2014, while still in prison, he faced new charges and was convicted of another 1 year in prison.

Personal life
Tajzadeh is a Ph.D. student in political science at University of Tehran and has two daughters. His wife is Fakhrossadat Mohtashamipour, the niece of cleric Ali Akbar Mohtashami-Pur. He has also lived in the United States for 31 months.

During an interview with Iranian Documentarist Mr. Hossein DEHBASHI, Mr. Tajzadeh acknowledged that he was not a good student during the last years of high school in Iran and received his high school diploma with difficulty but chose to continue his academic studies in the US in mid '70's since, according to Mr. Tajzadeh, "American universities and colleges were easy to enroll in". Mr. Tajzadeh, during the same interview with Mr. Dehbashi, stated: "I enrolled at Siskiyous College between Houston and Dallas [in Texas] just to have my [US issued] Student's Visa renewed but I let it go after a while". In fact, Mr. Tajzadeh acknowledges that he did not study in the US at all."But [there in Texas] we established "Falagh" Group since we believed in armed resistance and fighting against the Shah's Regime. "I went back to Iran then but my other friends like Mr. Khosravi, Mr. Baezi and some others left [USA] directly for Syria and Lebanon to be trained"; continued Mr. Tajzadeh.

References

External links
 Mostafa Tajzadeh's blog (in Persian)
 A short biography, Tajzadeh's short autobiography (in Persian)

	

	

1956 births
Living people
Iranian Vice Ministers
Iranian prisoners and detainees
Islamic Iran Participation Front politicians
Mojahedin of the Islamic Revolution of Iran Organization politicians
Presidential advisers of Iran
People convicted of action against national security by the Islamic Republic of Iran
People convicted of spreading propaganda against the system by the Islamic Republic of Iran
Iranian politicians convicted of crimes
Members of the National Council for Peace